Sergio Romero (born 22 November 1988) is a Colombian professional footballer who plays as forward.

References

External links 
 

1988 births
Living people
Colombian footballers
Association football forwards
Real Santander footballers
Once Caldas footballers
Deportivo Cali footballers
Millonarios F.C. players
Alianza Petrolera players
Atlético Bucaramanga footballers
Jaguares de Córdoba footballers
Categoría Primera A players
Categoría Primera B players
People from Bucaramanga
Sportspeople from Santander Department